Beatmania IIDX 17: Sirius is the 17th installment in Konami's Beatmania IIDX series of music video games. The main motif of Sirius'''s UI is astronomy, as the game is named after Sirius, known to be the brightest star in the night sky. Public location tests began on May 27, 2009, and the game itself was released on October 21, 2009.

Development
The existence of a 17th version in the beatmania IIDX series was confirmed by Konami on May 25, 2009, alongside the announcement of the first public location tests at the Cat's Eye arcade in Japan, which had already been promoting the location tests set to begin on the 27th of May for several days before the official announcement.

The location tests revealed new features contained in the game, such as "charge notes", and contained a sampling of songs slated to be included in the final release. Additional tests were held in late June to early July in Nagoya and at an arcade at the Norbesa in Sapporo.

GameplayBeatmania IIDX tasks the player with performing songs through a controller consisting of seven key buttons and a scratchable turntable. Hitting the notes with strong timing increases the score and groove gauge bar, allowing the player to finish the stage. Failing to do so depletes the gauge until it is empty, abruptly ending the song.Sirius adds two additional note types to the game, "charge notes", or Hold-me Notes which must be held for their duration, and the "back spin scratch", a type of scratching which must be spun on one direction continuously and spun again to the opposite side at the end of the note. Selected songs contained these features in the location test build.

A new "party mode" consists of a story mode where players earn "fans" based on their performances.

Another new mode, "League Mode" is a course where each song is selected based on the grade that they chose, from D grade to S grade. Songs chosen and the score that earns will convert into League points in the end. The selected songs number is ranged from 4 to 12. The score from this mode is also available to upgrade their own standards.

Song list
There are 66 new songs and 512 songs carried over from previous releases for a total of 578 songs in this game. The entire song list contains songs by Konami original artists and others.

Parallel Rotation
The "Parallel Rotation" is an Extra Stage system contained within Sirius, containing various tiers based on previous releases of the Beatmania IIDX franchise, each containing various remixes of songs from their respective title and songs previously exclusive to their respective home version.

Jubeat ripples x Beatmania IIDX 17 SIRIUS Append Style
Beatmania IIDX 17 Sirius can be linked with jubeat ripples which can unlock new songs for both games. Starting from March 8, 2010, the player can unlock "bass 2 bass", "IN THE NAME OF LOVE", and "Special One" using saved data of jubeat ripples on e-AMUSEMENT. Then, starting from March 18, 2010, if the player has played those three unlocks on Beatmania IIDX 17 Sirius, the player may unlock "AIR RAID FROM THA UNDAGROUND" in thecthen-newly released jubeat ripples APPEND. After playing that song, it would also unlock in Beatmania IIDX 17 Sirius. Finally, after playing all four songs above on Beatmania IIDX 17 Sirius'', "Evans" will be unlocked on that game.

References

External links
Official Website 

2009 video games
Arcade video games
Arcade-only video games
Beatmania games
Japan-exclusive video games
Multiplayer and single-player video games
Video games developed in Japan